Harding Field may refer to:
 Harding oilfield, an oil field in the North Sea operated by the Abu Dhabi National Energy Company
 Baton Rouge Metropolitan Airport, used by the US Air Force as Harding Field in World War II